Blum Blum Shub (B.B.S.) is a pseudorandom number generator proposed in 1986 by Lenore Blum, Manuel Blum and Michael Shub that is derived from Michael O. Rabin's one-way function.

Blum Blum Shub takes the form

,

where M = pq is the product of two large primes p and q. At each step of the algorithm, some output is derived from xn+1; the output is commonly either the bit parity of xn+1 or one or more of the least significant bits of x<sub>n+1</sub>.

The seed x0 should be an integer that is co-prime to M (i.e. p and q are not factors of x0) and not 1 or 0.

The two primes, p and q, should both be congruent to 3 (mod 4) (this guarantees that each quadratic residue has one square root which is also a quadratic residue), and should be safe primes with a small gcd((p-3)/2, (q-3)/2) (this makes the cycle length large).

An interesting characteristic of the Blum Blum Shub generator is the possibility to calculate any xi value directly (via Euler's theorem):

,

where  is the Carmichael function. (Here we have ).

Security
There is a proof reducing its security to the computational difficulty of factoring. When the primes are chosen appropriately, and O(log log M) lower-order bits of each xn are output, then in the limit as M grows large, distinguishing the output bits from random should be at least as difficult as solving the quadratic residuosity problem modulo M.

Example
We can expect to get a large cycle length for those small numbers, because .
The following table shows the output (in bits) for the different bit selection methods used to determine the output.

The following Common Lisp implementation provides a simple demonstration of the generator, in particular regarding the three bit selection methods. It is important to note that the requirements imposed upon the parameters p, q and s'' (seed) are not checked.

(defun get-number-of-1-bits (bits)
  "Returns the number of 1-valued bits in the integer-encoded BITS."
  (declare (type (integer 0 *) bits))
  (the (integer 0 *) (logcount bits)))

(defun get-even-parity-bit (bits)
  "Returns the even parity bit of the integer-encoded BITS."
  (declare (type (integer 0 *) bits))
  (the bit (mod (get-number-of-1-bits bits) 2)))

(defun get-least-significant-bit (bits)
  "Returns the least significant bit of the integer-encoded BITS."
  (declare (type (integer 0 *) bits))
  (the bit (ldb (byte 1 0) bits)))

(defun make-blum-blum-shub (&key (p 11) (q 23) (s 3))
  "Returns a function of no arguments which represents a simple
   Blum-Blum-Shub pseudorandom number generator, configured to use the
   generator parameters P, Q, and S (seed), and returning three values:
   (1) the number x[n+1],
   (2) the even parity bit of the number,
   (3) the least significant bit of the number.
   ---
   Please note that the parameters P, Q, and S are not checked in
   accordance to the conditions described in the article."
  (declare (type (integer 0 *) p q s))
  (let ((M    (* p q))       ;; M  = p * q
        (x[n] s))            ;; x0 = seed
    (declare (type (integer 0 *) M x[n]))
    #'(lambda
        ;; x[n+1] = x[n]^2 mod M
        (let ((x[n+1] (mod (* x[n] x[n]) M)))
          (declare (type (integer 0 *) x[n+1]))
          ;; Compute the random bit(s) based on x[n+1].
          (let ((even-parity-bit       (get-even-parity-bit       x[n+1]))
                (least-significant-bit (get-least-significant-bit x[n+1])))
            (declare (type bit even-parity-bit))
            (declare (type bit least-significant-bit))
            ;; Update the state such that x[n+1] becomes the new x[n].
            (setf x[n] x[n+1])
            (values x[n+1]
                    even-parity-bit
                    least-significant-bit))))))

;; Print the exemplary outputs.
(let ((bbs (make-blum-blum-shub :p 11 :q 23 :s 3)))
  (declare (type (function (values (integer 0 *) bit bit)) bbs))
  (format T "~&Keys: E = even parity, L = least significant")
  (format T "~2%")
  (format T "~&x[n+1] | E | L")
  (format T "~&--------------")
  (loop repeat 6 do
    (multiple-value-bind (x[n+1] even-parity-bit least-significant-bit)
        (funcall bbs)
      (declare (type (integer 0 *) x[n+1]))
      (declare (type bit           even-parity-bit))
      (declare (type bit           least-significant-bit))
      (format T "~&~6d | ~d | ~d"
                x[n+1] even-parity-bit least-significant-bit))))

References

Citations

Sources

External links
 GMPBBS, a C-language implementation by Mark Rossmiller
 BlumBlumShub, a Java-language implementation by Mark Rossmiller
 An implementation in Java
 Randomness tests

Pseudorandom number generators
Cryptographically secure pseudorandom number generators